Chetone ithrana is a moth of the family Erebidae. It was described by Arthur Gardiner Butler in 1871. It is found in Brazil and Peru.

Subspecies
Chetone ithrana ithrana (Brazil)
Chetone ithrana intersecta (Hering, 1925) (Peru)

References

Chetone
Moths described in 1871